John Fabian Carlson (May 5, 1875 – May 19, 1947) was a Swedish-born American Impressionist painter.

Background
John Fabian Carlson was born in Kolsebo in Västervik Municipality, Kalmar County, in Småland, Sweden. The Carlson family immigrated to the United States in 1884, making their home in Buffalo, New York. Carlson attended evening art classes at the Art Students League of Buffalo, New York. There Carlson received instruction from Lucius Wolcott Hitchcock, a former pupil at the Académie Colarossi in Paris and the Art Students League of New York.

Carlson won a scholarship in 1903 or 1904 to study with Lovell Birge Harrison  at the Byrdcliffe Colony in Woodstock, New York. Carlson began exhibiting work in such national shows as the annual of the Art Institute of Chicago in 1905. From this period on, he maintained an active exhibition schedule and submitted works in a variety of media, though with particular success in watercolor and oil. In 1906,  the Art Students League Summer School awarded Carlson his third scholarship to study Landscape painting. Carlson became a specialist in winter scenes and received an appointment as assistant director of Woodstock in 1908.

Career
In 1911, he won his first important award at the Swedish-American Exhibition in Chicago and when he was elected to Associate membership of the National Academy of Design. Shortly thereafter, he was appointed by the Art Students League to the directorship of the Woodstock School of Landscape Painting. In 1912, the Salmagundi Club presented him with the Vezin Prize for watercolors, as well as the first Isidor Prize. In the following year,  Carlson won a silver medal from the  Washington Society of Artists.

Carlson won a silver medal at the Panama–Pacific International Exposition of 1915. He was presented with the Carnegie Prize and the Altman First Prize   by the National Academy of Design in 1918, and, in the following year, he resigned his position as director of Woodstock School of Landscape Painting.  In 1920, Carlson began teaching during the summer months at the Broadmoor Art Academy in Colorado Springs, Colorado. Carlson founded the John F. Carlson School of Landscape Painting at Woodstock in 1922. Three years later, the artist was elected a full member of the National Academy of Design.

In 1928, Carlson published an instructional book entitled Elementary Principles of Landscape Paintings. The book was reprinted in 1953, 1958, 1970 and 1973. More recent editions have been titled Carlson's Guide to Landscape Painting.

References

Other sources
 Haugan, Reidar Rye    Prominent Artists and Exhibits of Their Work in Chicago (Chicago Norske Klub. Nordmanns-Forbundet, 24: 371—374,Volume 7, 1933)

Related reading
John F. Carlson, N.A., 1874-1945: Exhibition II, from September 17, 1980 (Vose Galleries of Boston, Inc., Boston, MA: 1980)
John F. Carlson, N.A., 1874-1945: Paintings of Colorado, Canadian and Smoky Mountains : Exhibition III from May 11, 1982 (Vose Galleries of Boston, Inc.,  Boston, MA: 1982
John F. Carlson: [exhibition] February 6-March 3, 1993 (Babcock Galleries. New York: 1993)

External links

Swedish-American Works from the Hillstrom Collection
Gallery of John Fabian Carlson Impressionists Paintings
Fourth annual exhibition of paintings by John F. Carlson, an exhibition catalog from The Metropolitan Museum of Art Libraries (fully available online as PDF)

1875 births
1947 deaths
People from Västervik Municipality
19th-century American painters
American male painters
20th-century American painters
American Impressionist painters
Swedish emigrants to the United States
Artists from New York (state)
Art Students' League of Buffalo alumni
Académie Colarossi alumni
National Academy of Design members
19th-century American male artists
20th-century American male artists